I Got the Feelin is the nineteenth studio album by American musician James Brown. The album was released in April 1968, by King Records.

Track listing

References

1968 albums
James Brown albums
Albums produced by James Brown
King Records (United States) albums